Vaskino is a rural locality (a village) in Gaynskoye Rural Settlement, Gaynsky District, Perm Krai, Russia. The population was 26 as of 2010. There is one street.

Geography 
Vaskino is located 18 km south of Gayny (the district's administrative centre) by road. Chazhegovo is the nearest rural locality.

References

Rural localities in Gaynsky District